Vaaren is a novel written by Norwegian Nobel laureate Sigrid Undset, published in 1914. The book was a hit with the public, and had four impressions during the first year from its release. The protagonists "Rose Wegener" and "Torkild Christensen" enter a happy marriage, but face problems after the death of their child.

References

1914 novels
20th-century Norwegian novels
Novels set in Norway